À chacun son histoire (To Each Their Story) is the second studio album and the first internationally released album by Natasha St-Pier. The album was released in 2000.

Track listing

Charts

Certifications

References

2000 albums
Natasha St-Pier albums
Sony Music France albums